Valeriy Rudakov (born 30 June 1955), is a Soviet player and coach from Ukraine.

External links

 Sharafudinov, V. Rudakov: "46 years in football? It's unbelievable!" Futbolnyi Klub. 31 August 2013.
 Yasenov, Ye. Valeriy Rudakov: "We simply had to win the "gold" in 1979..." Terrikon. 9 January 2014.

1955 births
Living people
Sportspeople from Donetsk
Donetsk National University of Economics and Trade alumni
Soviet footballers
Ukrainian footballers
Soviet Union youth international footballers
FC Shakhtar Donetsk players
FC Elektrometalurh-NZF Nikopol players
FC Mariupol players
FC Antratsyt Kirovske players
Ukrainian football managers
FC Shakhtar Donetsk managers
FC Shakhtar-3 Donetsk managers
Komsomol
Communist Party of the Soviet Union members
Association football defenders